Helena Boettcher was a Polish luger who competed during the 1950s. She won the silver medal in the women's singles event at the 1958 FIL World Luge Championships in Krynica, Poland.

References
Hickok sports information on World champions in luge and skeleton.

Polish female lugers
Possibly living people
Year of birth missing (living people)
Place of birth missing (living people)